Gante is a surname of Spanish origin. People with the surname include: 

 Margarita Mariscal de Gante (born 1954), Spanish jurist and politician
 Pedro de Gante  (c. 1480 – 1572), Franciscan missionary in Mexico

See also
 L-Gante, stage name of Elian Ángel Valenzuela (born 2000), Argentine musical artist

Spanish-language surnames